The 1999 Sydney International was a tennis tournament played on outdoor hard courts at the NSW Tennis Centre in Sydney in Australia that was part of the International Series of the 1999 ATP Tour and of Tier II of the 1999 WTA Tour. The tournament was held from 11 through 16 January 1999.

WTA entrants

Seeds

Other entrants
The following players received wildcards into the women's singles main draw:
  Rachel McQuillan
  Alicia Molik

The following players received wildcards into the women's doubles main draw:
  Alicia Molik /  Dominique Van Roost

The following players received entry from the women's singles qualifying draw:

  Karina Habšudová
  Inés Gorrochategui
  Amélie Mauresmo
  Tatiana Panova

The following players received entry from the women's doubles qualifying draw:

  Sonya Jeyaseelan /  Janet Lee

Finals

Men's singles

 Todd Martin defeated  Àlex Corretja, 6–3, 7–6(7–5)
 It was Martin's only title of the year and the 12th of his career.

Women's singles

 Lindsay Davenport defeated  Martina Hingis, 6–4, 6–3
 It was Davenport's 1st title of the year and the 44th of her career.

Men's doubles

 Sébastien Lareau /  Daniel Nestor defeated  Patrick Galbraith /  Paul Haarhuis, 6–3, 6–4

Women's doubles

 Elena Likhovtseva /  Ai Sugiyama defeated  Mary Joe Fernández /  Anke Huber, 6–3, 2–6, 6–0

External links
 Official website
 ATP tournament profile
 WTA tournament profile

 
Sydney International, 1999